Happiness is a 1924 American silent comedy film directed by King Vidor and starring stage actress Laurette Taylor in one of her rare film appearances. The film is based on the 1914 Broadway play of the same name written by Taylor's husband J. Hartley Manners.

Plot
As described in a film magazine review, Jenny Wray, the sole support of her mother, obtains work in a modiste's shop. She is called on to deliver several gowns to Mrs. Chrystal Pole. Mrs. Pole, who is bored with life, becomes interested in Jenny's philosophy of happiness, and induces her to make her home at the Pole mansion. However, Jenny soon tires of it and returns to Brooklyn. She continues to cultivate the friendship of Mrs. Pole, who aids her in her efforts to have her own modiste's shop. Fermoy MacDonough, an electrician, falls in love with Jenny and they marry. In several years Jenny has a shop of her own and continues to spread happiness.

Cast

Production
Happiness marked the second and final cinematic collaboration between Vidor and well-known stage actress Laurette Taylor. Based on the one-act play of the same name by Taylor's husband J. Hartley Manners the film adaption was a box office success, due in part to Vidor's personal interest in the theme and Taylor's, restrained performance 
 
Taylor would make one more movie with M-G-M studios in 1924, One Night in Rome, directed by Clarence Badger.

Theme
Manners' vehicle for Laurette Taylor is largely a facsimile of his 1912 play Peg o' My Heart, with the setting moved from rural British Isles to the urban New York City.

The film version introduces a new facet to Manners' "creaky" scenario. Vidor's identification with the Populist movement and its pro-agrarian and pro-nativist ideals is enlarged in Happiness to include a broader spectrum of the working class, including poor and urban immigrants. The entrepreneurial Jenny (Taylor) struggles in this Brooklyn lower-class milieu to ultimately achieve social and financial security. Vidor makes explicit his political philosophy when the now successful Jenny encounters her early alter-ego, a poor, but ambitious girl (also named Jenny) on the streets of Brooklyn, with the inter-title "And the endless chain of Jennys goes on in all big cities..."

Preservation
Prints of Happiness are preserved at George Eastman House and Gosfilmofond (Russian State archives) Moscow.

Footnotes

References
Baxter, John. 1976. King Vidor. Simon & Schuster, Inc. Monarch Film Studies. LOC Card Number 75-23544.
Brownlow, Kevin and Kobal, John. 1979. Hollywood: The Pioneers. Alfred A. Knopf Inc. A Borzoi Book, New York.

External links

1924 films
1924 comedy films
Silent American comedy films
American silent feature films
American black-and-white films
American films based on plays
Films directed by King Vidor
Films set in New York City
Metro Pictures films
Films with screenplays by J. Hartley Manners
1920s American films
1920s English-language films